G8 Education is Australia’s largest for-profit early childhood and care (ECEC) provider. Its 440+ childcare centres are marketed under 21 brands such as Kindy Patch Kids, Jellybeans, Kinder Haven, First Grammar, Community Kids, Pelicans Learning for Life and Casa Bambini.

History 
The corporation was founded in 2006 as Early Learning Services. In December 2007 it began selling shares on the Australian stock exchange, at a time when it owned 38 child care centres. In 2010 it merged with Payce Child Care Pty Ltd and the name was changed to G8 Education Ltd. 

By 2022 it had grown to 450 child care centres.

In 2010 it began operating childcare centres in Singapore, but in October 2020 exited the country by selling its childcare centres to a Singapore company.

Controversies 
In December 2020 G8 Education became embroiled in a staff underpayment issue. It self-reported to regulators that it had underpaid up to 27,000 employees between $50 million and $80 million. It said it had the funds to make restitution but the issue saw it shares slump on the ASX. 
In February 2021 G8 Education announced it was raising fees by 4.5 per cent as it recovered from the effects of the COVID-19 pandemic and restore occupancy levels which had dropped during the economic downturn.

References

Companies based on the Gold Coast, Queensland
Companies listed on the Australian Securities Exchange
Australian brands
Australian companies established in 2006